Stob Dubh (880 m) is a mountain in the Grampian Mountains of Scotland, at the head of Loch Etive north of the village of Taynuilt.

The mountain offers excellent hillwalking opportunities, and even though it is tough going in places, it is possible to reach the summit without any scrambling.

References

Mountains and hills of Highland (council area)
Marilyns of Scotland
Corbetts